Ken Jungwirth (born 3 August 1946) is a former Australian rules footballer who played with Melbourne and Carlton in the Victorian Football League (VFL).

Notes

External links 

Ken Jungwirth's profile at Blueseum

1946 births
Carlton Football Club players
Melbourne Football Club players
Australian rules footballers from Victoria (Australia)
Living people